South Kivu Sugar Refinery (SKSR) ( French: Sucrerie du Kivu), formerly called Kiliba Sugar Refinery, (French: Sucrerie de Kiliba), is a sugar manufacturing company in the Democratic Republic of the Congo. After a 25-year period of inactivity since 1996, the sugar factory resumed production in March 2021, under new management and a new brand name.

Location
The sugar refinery and the headquarters of the company that operates the factory are located in the town of Kiliba, in the Ruzizi Region, in Uvira Territory in South Kivu Province, in eastern DR Congo. The geographical coordinates of South Kivu Sugar Refinery are: 
3°14'11.0"S, 29°10'07.0"E (Latitude:-3.236389; Longitude:29.168611).

Overview
The sugar factory was established in 1956 by a Belgian national, Baron Kronacker, under the name "Sucrerie de Kiliba" (Kiliba Sugar Refinery). The factory averaged between 15,000 tons and 19,000 tons of sugar, in annual output, with maximum production of 21,000 tons, achieved once in its history. Due to mismanagement, annual sugar output fell to 900 tons by 1996. That same year saw the beginning of the First Congo War. Sucrerie Kiliba closed down in 1996 due to economic reasons and a deteriorating security situation.

Take-over and rehabilitation
In the 2000s the Government of the Democratic Republic of the Congo, which owned 40 percent of Kiliba Sugar Refinery, dissolved the company and invited qualified investors to form a new company and rehabilitate the plantation and factory. They settled on a consortium, based in Tanzania, with a track record of profitable investments in sugar growing, processing and marketing. The consortium is referred to as the "Super Group of Companies".

They also rehabilitated and modernized the factory. The Congolese government, did not participate financially in the company's modernization and upgrade, despite being a shareholder in the business.

Ownership
As of March 2021, the shareholding in the stock of South Kivu Sugar Refinery is as illustrated in the table below.

See also
 Economy of the Democratic Republic of the Congo
 List of sugar manufacturers in the Democratic Republic of the Congo

References

External links
Kiliba Sugar Complex Rehabilitation And Extension Project As at October 1995.

Food and drink companies established in 1956
1956 establishments in the Belgian Congo
South Kivu
Sugar companies of the Democratic Republic of the Congo
Manufacturing companies of the Democratic Republic of the Congo
Agriculture in the Democratic Republic of the Congo